Aleksandr Petrovich Chimbiryov (born 17 November 1961 in Shakhtostroitel, Novomoskovsky District) is a Russian football manager and a former player.

References

1961 births
People from Novomoskovsky District
Living people
Soviet footballers
FC Khimik-Arsenal players
FC Arsenal Tula players
FC Ural Yekaterinburg players
Russian footballers
Russian Premier League players
Russian football managers
FC Arsenal Tula managers
Association football midfielders
Sportspeople from Tula Oblast